The Croatia women's national basketball team is the national representative for Croatia in international women's basketball competition. The team is controlled by the Croatian Basketball Federation (Hrvatski košarkaški savez).

Results
Prior to 1992 the Croatia women's national basketball team competed as a part of the Yugoslavia women's national basketball team.

The lone competition the Croatia women's national team have never qualified for is the FIBA Women's World Cup.

Olympic Games

EuroBasket Women

Mediterranean Games
Croatia is the most successful women's basketball team at the Mediterranean Games.

 At the 2013 Mediterranean Games the women's basketball tournament was cancelled because too few teams applied for the competition which was mainly due to coinciding dates with EuroBasket 2013.

Team

Current roster
The roster for the EuroBasket Women 2021.

Notable players
 Korana Longin-Zanze
 Sandra Mandir
 Anđa Jelavić
 Antonija Mišura

References

External links

 
FIBA profile
Croatia National Team – Women at Eurobasket.com

 
 
Women's national basketball teams